Still Life is a live album by progressive metal band Fates Warning, released in 1998. The Japanese release of this album includes a studio cover version of the Scorpions song "In Trance" (Track 8 on Disc II).

Track listing

Disc one

Disc two

Japanese edition

Band members
Ray Alder - Vocals
Jim Matheos - Guitars
Mark Zonder - Drums

Guest musicians
Bernie Versailles - Guitars
Joey Vera - Bass
Jason Keazer - Keyboards

References

Fates Warning albums
1997 live albums
Massacre Records live albums